Saïd Saber  is a French professional footballer who plays for Dijon FCO.

Club career 
Saïd Saber started his career at Besançon Football, later joining the Racing Besançon, that he eventually left for the Dijon FCO academy in June 2020.

After joining the under-19 in the early 2021–22 season, he made his professional debut for Dijon on the 8 January 2022, replacing Mattéo Ahlinvi at the 63rd minute of a 1–2 Ligue 2 home loss to Nîmes Olympique. While his team was affected by both injuries, covid and players leaving to the 2021 AFCON, Saber became the youngest player to ever play a league game for Dijon, aged only 16 years and 11 months.

References

External links

2005 births
Living people
French footballers
Association football midfielders
Dijon FCO players
Ligue 2 players